Falconer was a Swedish power metal band from Mjölby, formed in 1999 by the former guitarist of Mithotyn, Stefan Weinerhall. Falconer carried on many of the traditions set by Weinerhall's previous band and played a fusion style of power metal that utilizes folk instrumentation and melody to create a more medieval sound.

Biography

Origins

In 1992, the blackened death metal act Cerberus was founded by Stefan Weinerhall, Christian "Christer" Schütz and Johan, who left shortly afterward. After one year, they renamed themselves Mithotyn. As Mithotyn, they did not release an album until 1997. Much of the material featured on the three albums of their career were previously composed or featured on one of their previous demos such as the song "The Guardian" from Promo '96. The group released three albums: In the Sign of the Ravens (1997, Black Diamond Productions) followed by King of the Distant Forest (1998, Invasion Records), and finishing with Gathered Around the Oaken Table (1999, Invasion Records). Mithotyn officially dissolved in 1999.

Stefan Weinerhall, born 1976 in Mjölby, Sweden founded Falconer in 1999. He had planned to form a folk-influenced melodic metal band similar to his previous project, but with a focus on clean singing rather than harsh vocals. A demo was recorded using a drum machine and Swedish actor/singer Mathias Blad agreed to do vocals as a session member. After shopping the demo to labels, drummer Karsten Larsson (also ex-Mithotyn) was added to the lineup and Blad joined as a permanent member. Eventually, the band signed to Metal Blade Records. Weinerhall had played in the Viking metal band Mithotyn from their formation until their eventual split in 1999. He and his Mithotyn bandmate, Karl Beckman, made two albums with the black, thrash metal band Indungeon.  Weinerhall played bass on the first album before switching to his more accustomed role as guitarist for their second album, The Misanthropocalypse.  He wrote nearly all Falconer's music and lyrics.

In November 2000, the band entered the Los Angered Recording (now Sonic Train Studios) with Andy LaRocque and Jacob Hansen behind the knobs. Their debut album Falconer was recorded in three weeks and was released in March in Europe and May in the United States. The album was met with critical success, and demand for live performances led to the addition of session members.

Falconer returned to Los Angered in November 2001. Nine tracks and one bonus track were recorded and mixed during the 24 days. In addition, the band licensed the album to Soundholic for Japanese distribution. The new album Chapters from a Vale Forlorn was released on 7 February in Japan and on 11 March in Europe and in the US.

Members

The band added Anders Johansson of Swedish band Vrävarna (not to be confused with the HammerFall drummer of the same name) and Peder Johansson on second guitar and bass, respectively, as live session members, and performed at Wacken Open Air, Rock Machina, and Bang Your Head Festival during the summer. Following these appearances, demand for live performances from the band increased considerably, and vocalist Mathias Blad, who could not commit to touring due to his acting career, agreed to amicably leave the band.

Line-up changes

Mathias Blad
Blad is a Swedish actor and singer. was born in Motala, Sweden. He studied musical-theatre at Balettakademien in Gothenburg between 1989–1992 and trained as an actor at the London Academy of Music and Dramatic Art between 1996-1999. He has worked extensively in Swedish theatre since 1992, where his work included playing Peter in Jesus Christ Superstar at the Gothenburg Opera, Claude in Hair in Malmö, and Action in West Side Story at Värmlandsoperan. In 2018, he performed the role of Tempest in the Swedish musical recording of Tivolisaga, a musical by Johan Christher Schütz and Johan Pettersson based on Shakespeare's Romeo and Juliet.

In 1999 Blad recorded demo vocals of the former Mithotyn guitarist, Stefan Weinerhall. After Weinerhall's Falconer project was signed by Metal Blade Records, he agreed to stay on as a full-time member. Since Falconer was a studio band comprising only three members, there was no danger of touring opportunities clashing with his theatre work. This situation changed in 2002 when an expanded Falconer—now a fully rounded band of five people—were offered touring slots that the rest of the members wanted to pursue. At that time, Mathias amicably agreed to leave the band, having performed on two studio albums with them. After two albums with vocalist Göbel filling in, Weinerhall and drummer Karsten Larsson decided to approach Blad about a return to Falconer, which he agreed to. The band has since stated that live appearances may be infrequent due to Blad's theatre commitments.

Kristoffer Göbel
In November 2002, Karl Kristoffer Göbel (Swedish vocalist for Destiny) had been added to the line-up replacing Blad.  Göbel was fired from the band before 2005 to make way for the returning Blad. He has since started a new band, Metal Für Alle, along with Snowy Shaw and his former Destiny bandmate Mikael Åberg.

Other changes
Falconer returned to Los Angered to record The Sceptre of Deception, a concept album that, according to the band, is a mix between the two previous albums, but with some more unexpected turns in the music. The album featured multiple guest appearances, including backing vocals from former vocalist Mathias Blad and future Amaranthe vocalist Elize Ryd, as well as lead guitars from Andy LaRocque on the track "Hear Me Pray." It was released on 6 October 2003.

Following the release of the album, internal difficulties brought on by problems with scheduling rehearsals arose within the band and both Anders and Peder Johansson were removed from the line-up. They were eventually replaced with Jimmy Hedlund and Magnus Linhardt, respectively. With this new line-up in place, Falconer recorded Grime vs. Grandeur, a record that departed quite significantly from their established sound by replacing the folk melodies, themes, and lyrics with more traditional heavy metal arrangements. The album received a generally muted response from fans as the band were seen to have lost their somewhat unusual identity.

Return to the roots
In November 2005, Göbel announced via the Falconer forum that he had been fired and that Mathias Blad had been re-hired in an effort to return to the band's original sound. Recordings took place over the course of 2006, and a new album entitled Northwind was released in September of that year.

In an announcement on the official website on 21 April 2007, Stefan announced that Falconer had extended their deal with Metal Blade for four more albums. The album Among Beggars And Thieves was released in September 2008.

Armod was released on 3 June 2011. The album's songs are all in Swedish. According to Weinerhall, "The album is embracing the Swedish folk music to a greater extent than before making it sound slightly more down to earth. The music spans from acoustic songs with cello, flute and fiddle to songs with blast beats and really heavy riffing."

The next album, Black Moon Rising, was announced on 15 December 2013. It was revealed to be completed on 16 March 2014 and the album art and track listing were revealed one month later, on 16 April 2014.

In 2020, the band announced what would be their final album release prior to ultimately disbanding the band, From a Dying Ember. The band wanted to make this final album "as good as we possibly could and really concentrate on having all Falconer elements present".

Discography
 Falconer (2001)
 Chapters from a Vale Forlorn (2002)
 The Sceptre of Deception (2003)
 Grime vs. Grandeur (2005)
 Northwind (2006)
 Among Beggars and Thieves (2008)
 Armod (2011)
 Black Moon Rising (2014)
 From a Dying Ember (2020)

Band members 
Final lineup
 Mathias Blad – vocals (1999-2002, 2005–2020), keyboards (1999-2002)
 Stefan Weinerhall – rhythm and lead guitar, backing vocals (1999–2020), keyboards (2002–2020), bass (1999-2002)
 Karsten Larsson – drums (1999–2020)
 Jimmy Hedlund – lead guitar, backing vocals (2004–2020)
 Magnus Linhardt – bass (2004–2020)
Former members
 Kristoffer Göbel – vocals (2002-2005)
 Anders Johansson – guitars (2002-2004)
 Peder Johansson – bass (2002-2003)

Timeline

References

External links

 Official website

Swedish power metal musical groups
Swedish folk metal musical groups
Metal Blade Records artists
Musical quintets
1999 establishments in Sweden
2020 disestablishments in Sweden
Musical groups established in 1999
Musical groups disestablished in 2020